Ficus morifolia can refer to:

Ficus morifolia , a synonym of Ficus palmata 
Ficus morifolia , a synonym of Ficus lateriflora 
Ficus morifolia , a synonym of Ficus assamica

References